Elisabeth Eschbaum (26 January 1910 - 29 October 2000) was a German actress. She appeared in more than twenty films from 1949 to 1992.

Selected filmography

References

External links 

1910 births
2000 deaths
German film actresses